Holmes Creek is a stream in Clay County in the U.S. state of Missouri. It is a tributary to the Fishing River.

The stream headwaters arise at  just south of U.S. Route 69. The stream flows northeast passing under Route 69 and past the community of Chandler.

Holmes Creek has the name of the local Holmes family.

See also
List of rivers of Missouri

References

Rivers of Clay County, Missouri
Rivers of Missouri